Eoophyla quinqualis is a moth in the family Crambidae. It was described by Snellen in 1892. It is found on Sulawesi and Java.

References

Eoophyla
Moths described in 1892